Pitsj (founded 1999 in Oslo, Norway) is a female Norwegian a cappella quintet. The band consists of Anine and Benedikte Kruse, the twin sisters Ane Carmen and Ida Roggen, and Anja Eline Skybakmoen (who replaced Tora Augestad when she left Pitsj in 2007).

Biography 

Pitsj released their first album, Pitsj, on Grappa Records, in September 2006. It was recorded in The Real Group's studio in Stockholm, Sweden and produced by their producer, Anders Edenroth. This album has received good reviews from different Norwegian news papers, one of them Dagbladet. Their repertoire focuses mainly on Norwegian pop and jazz. They made a major contribution to Kjempesjansen 2006.

Pitsj has performed at a large number of Norwegian festivals and concert scenes, and they have featured on Norwegian television. Pitsj has also made joint performances with The Real Group on several occasions, in addition to cooperations with the likes of Ole Edvard Antonsen, Odd Nordstoga, Sigvart Dagsland and Henning Sommerro.

Band members 

Present members
Anine Kruse - vocals
Benedikte Kruse - vocals
Ane Carmen Roggen - vocals
Ida Roggen - vocals
Anja Eline Skybakmoen - vocals

Past members
Tora Augestad - vocals

Festival Appearances 
Vestfold-festspillene
Stavanger International Chamber Music Festival
Hardingtonar festival
Gloppen musikkfest
Follafestivalen
Landssangerstevnet in Molde
The Real A Cappella Festival (Sweden)

Discography 

Albums
2006: Pitsj (Grappa Music)
2009: Gjenfortellinger (Grappa Music)
2014: Snow Is Falling (Grappa Music)

EP's and Singles
2006: Den Du Veit (Grappa Music)
2006: Voi Voi (Grappa Music)
2016: Syngedame / Pakker sammen og reiser (Grappa Music)

Appearances
2008: Edvard Grieg in jazz mood (Universal Music), with Kjell Karlsen ("I Dovregubbens hall")

References

External links

Pitsj fragment VokaLarm 2010 Trondheim on YouTube
Pitsj - Snow is falling on YouTube

Norwegian jazz ensembles
Musical groups established in 1999
1999 establishments in Norway
Musical groups from Oslo